Musokotwane is an African surname. Notable people with the surname include:

Kebby Musokotwane (1946–1996), Zambian politician 
Situmbeko Musokotwane (born 1956), Zambian politician and economist

Surnames of African origin